Abak is also a nickname for the painter Hans von Aachen. For the place in Pakistan, see Abak, FATA.

 
Abak is a town and Local Government Area in Akwa Ibom State, Nigeria. The LGA  was previously part of Cross River State. It was later sub divided into other local government areas such as Oruk Anam, Etim Ekpo, Ukanafun and Ika. Notable tribes include the Annang. The major economic activities of the people of this area before and after the Nigerian civil war was palm produce exported through river port at Ekpene Okpo, Ntak Ibesit, a distance of about 8 km from Abak town. Abak town, the local government headquarters is located about 18 kilometres from Uyo, the State capital. It has a landmass of 304 square kilometers.  Abak to say the least, is the shadow of its former self due to politically motivated neglect by successive governments in Akwa Ibom state. Abak was the economic hub of the former Southeastern Nigeria before the civil war. The Nigerian Army barrack that is  popularly known as Ibagwa Barrack is located or can be found in the Abak.

The major economic activities of the people is palm produce. Before the Nigerian civil war, Abak Division was the major producer of palm oil and kernel exported through river ports at Ntak Ibesit and Ikot Okoro. Abak is blessed with natural resources which includes, Rich mineral deposits such as sand, gravel, clay, salt and crude oil (corked). It is situated in the tropical rain forest that supply abundant palm produce, cassava and various vegetables.

History
Abak became the seat of Government in 1902 after the war conquest of the  British armed forces  that invaded the valley lying between the Ediene and Abak Clans. The outcome of that victory penetration into the hinterland by the colonial soldiers and eventual installation of the government. Valley in the local language is called “Aba-ag” and fighting is “Anwan.” By joining the two words “Aba-ag” and “Anwan” the names “Aba-ag Ikot Anwan” was given to the newly established entity. The seat of Government kept growing until 1957 and 1958 when it gained the status of Divisional Council Headquarters. At the establishment, the area included the present Ukanafun, Oruk Anam, Etim Ekpo, Ika and the present Abak. All the places mentioned here have been developed to become full-fledged local government areas.

At the end of the civil war, the South Eastern State Government was created and Abak became one of the Development Administrative Headquarters and with the local government reforms of 1976, Abak became a full-fledged Local Government Area and has remained so till date.

People
The people are generally from the Annang ethnic group. They are reputed for their resourcefulness and highly mobilized for economic development and political integration within the State and the Nigerian federation...

Culture
Abak's rich cultural heritage is reflected through traditional dances such as Ekpe, Ekpo, Idiongitals, etc, though majority are of the Christian faith.

Despite of the advent of Western civilization and religion, there are some cultural institutions that still exist, such as Ekpo, Ekpe, Idiong, Attat Utu-Ekpe. These were powerful instruments of traditional governance before they lost their relevance in the mid-nineteenth century with the arrival of European missionaries.

Population
Males 73,578, females 65,512, for a total of 139,090 according to 2006 National Census.

Tourism 

Private area driven cordiality foundation like inns, stops, gardens and clubs.

Natural resources 
The Abak people are blessed with natural resources as sand, gravel, clay, salt and crude oil (corked). it can be found at the tropical rain forest which provides palm produce, cassava and various vegetables for their people.

References

 Official website of the Akwa Ibom State Government.
 Akwa Ibom State Government

Towns in Akwa Ibom State
Local Government Areas in Akwa Ibom State
1902 establishments in the Southern Nigeria Protectorate